= Gor Factory =

European textile company

- Company type: Private
- Industry: Clothing
- Founded: 1985; 41 years ago
- Headquarters: Murcia, Spain
- Area served: Europe
- Products: Promotional clothing, sports, work equipment
- Brands: Roly
- Website: www.gorfactory.es/en

Gor Factory is a Spanish textile company that provides clothing, work and sports equipment across Europe. The company was founded in 1985 and their headquarters are based in Murcia.

It has been regarded as one of the most outstanding companies for Murcia region economy and its economic growth and international expansion have been honoured by the German Chamber of Commerce (AHK) in 2013, during Stuttgart Fair (Baden-Württemberg, Germany). Its brand Roly has had its own slot in the popular TV TecStyle Vision and it has been highlighted because of its leadership in the textile market intended for professional and sports use, as well as its responsibility in the textile industry.

Its goods have the OEKO-TEX Standard 100 Certificate which recognises both, its responsibility in the industry and textile trade and the certification of harmless textiles.
